Kakwa may refer to:

Cacua language or Kákwa, spoken in Colombia
Kakwa language, spoken in Democratic Republic of the Congo, South Sudan, and Uganda
Kãkwã people of Vaupés, Colombia
Kakwa people of Central Africa
Kakwa Provincial Park and Protected Area in British Columbia, Canada
Kakwa River, a river in British Columbia and Alberta, Canada
Kakwa Wildlands Park, in Alberta Canada